Fatter is an Iranian short-range air-to-air missile based on the U.S.-built AIM-9 Sidewinder missile.

Development 
Fatter is a short range missile which uses an AIM-9 Sidewinder missile body and Iranian avionics. In 2008 the Islamic Republic of Iran Air Force (IRIAF) reported test launches of a new IR-guided missile that was identified as the Fatter. IRIAF Commander Brigadier General Hassan Shahsafi told news agencies that the missile had a range of 40 kilometers. In November 2009 Shahsafi told state TV that mass production of the missile was to be launched. No other information is available about the missile.

Operators

References

External links
 Picture

Air-to-air missiles of Iran
Military equipment introduced in the 2000s